Eamonn Wilmott is a British entrepreneur born in 1961.

Career
Wilmott was educated at John Hampden Grammar School in High Wycombe.
In the mid 90s he founded Online Magic, with Andy Hobsbawm. The company later became part of the Agency.com network.

In 2008 Wilmott set up 'Horses First Racing' with Australian trainer Jeremy Gask.
July 2010 Wilmott was appointed Chairman of the Board of Thoroughbred Owner and Breeder Magazine and served for 5 years. 
November 2012 Wilmott co-founded Total Performance Data Ltd with Will Duff Gordon. 
In March 2013, Wilmott was appointed to the Board of Mark Allen Group.
In December 2014, Wilmott was appointed to the Board of the British Horseracing Authority.
In 2018, Wilmott was appointed chairman of the Alizeti Group.

References

Living people
English businesspeople
1961 births